Erik Stadigh (21 May 1928 – 13 January 2003) was a Finnish sailor. He competed in the 5.5 Metre event at the 1952 Summer Olympics.

References

External links
 

1928 births
2003 deaths
Finnish male sailors (sport)
Olympic sailors of Finland
Sailors at the 1952 Summer Olympics – 5.5 Metre
Sportspeople from Helsinki